Elvis Joseph "Tee-Joe" Perrodin (December 14, 1956 – June 10, 2012) was an American jockey in Thoroughbred horse racing who won more than 3,000 races, rode six winners on a single racecard, and someone the Thoroughbred Times called "a master of the Fair Grounds turf'."

Nicknamed "Tee-Joe" which translates from Cajun French to "Little Joe," on February 3, 2012, Perrodin announced his retirement. Only days later, he was diagnosed as having brain cancer, already advanced to the 4th stage. He died of lung cancer on June 10, 2012, at the age of 55.

References

1956 births
2012 deaths
Deaths from brain tumor
Cajun jockeys
People from Rayne, Louisiana